Kang Jae-soon (Korean: 강재순; born December 15, 1964) is a South Korean former footballer who played as a midfielder.

He started professional career at Ulsan Hyundai in 1987.

He was in the squad of South Korea U-20 in 1983 FIFA World Youth Championship

He was winner of K League Best XI in 1989 K League.

References

External links 
 
 

1964 births
Living people
Association football forwards
Pohang Steelers players
South Korean footballers
Sungkyunkwan University alumni